Lemuria, or Limuria, was a continent proposed in 1864 by zoologist Philip Sclater, theorized to have sunk beneath the Indian Ocean, later appropriated by occultists in supposed accounts of human origins. The theory was discredited with the discovery of plate tectonics and continental drift in the 20th century.

The hypothesis was proposed as an explanation for the presence of lemur fossils in Madagascar and India but not in Africa or the Middle East. Biologist Ernst Haeckel's suggestion in 1870 that Lemuria could be the ancestral home of mankind caused the hypothesis to move beyond the scope of geology and zoogeography, ensuring its popularity outside of the framework of the scientific community.

Occultist and founder of theosophy Helena Blavatsky, during the latter part of the 19th century, placed Lemuria in the system of her mystical-religious doctrine, claiming that this continent was the homeland of the human ancestors, whom she called Lemurians. The writings of Blavatsky had a significant impact on Western esotericism, popularizing the myth of Lemuria and its mystical inhabitants.

Theories about Lemuria became untenable when, in the 1960s, the scientific community accepted Alfred Wegener's theory of continental drift, presented in 1912, but the idea lived on in the popular imagination, especially in relation to the Theosophist tradition.

Evolution of the idea
Lemuria was hypothesized as a land bridge, now sunken, which would account for certain discontinuities in biogeography. This idea has been rendered obsolete by modern theories of plate tectonics. Sunken continents such as Zealandia in the Pacific, and Mauritia and the Kerguelen Plateau in the Indian Ocean do exist, but no geological formation under the Indian or Pacific Oceans is known that could have served as a land bridge between continents.

The idea of Lemuria was later incorporated into the philosophy of Theosophy and has persisted as a theme in pseudoarchaeology and discussions of lost lands. There is a vast fringe literature pertaining to Lemuria and to related concepts such as the Lemurian Fellowship and other things "Lemurian".  All share a common belief that a continent existed in what is now either the Pacific Ocean or the Indian Ocean in ancient times and claim that it became submerged as a result of a geological cataclysm. An important element of the mythology of Lemuria is that it was the location of the emergence of complex knowledge systems that formed the basis for later beliefs.

The concept of Lemuria was developed in detail by James Churchward, who referred to it as Mu and identified it as a lost continent in the Pacific Ocean. Churchward appropriated this name from Augustus Le Plongeon, who had used the concept of the "Land of Mu" to refer to the imaginary lost continent of Atlantis. Churchward's books included The Lost Continent of Mu, the Motherland of Men (1926), The Children of Mu (1931), The Sacred Symbols of Mu (1933), Cosmic Forces of Mu (1934), and Second Book of Cosmic Forces of Mu (1935). The relationships between Lemuria/Mu and Atlantis are discussed in detail in the book Lost Continents: The Atlantis Theme in History, Science, and Literature (1954) by L. Sprague de Camp.

Pseudoarchaeological and New Age beliefs about Lemuria have been promoted in books by fringe author Frank Collin writing under the pen name Frank Joseph in books published by Inner Traditions – Bear & Company. Additional discussion of fantastic speculation about the imaginary land of Lemuria are examples of Lemuria in popular culture.

Scientific origins

Postulation
In 1864, "The Mammals of Madagascar" by zoologist and biogeographer Philip Sclater appeared in The Quarterly Journal of Science. Using a classification he referred to as lemurs, but which included related primate groups, and puzzled by the presence of their fossils in Madagascar and India, but not in Africa or the Middle East, Sclater proposed that Madagascar and India had once been part of a larger continent (he was correct in this; though in reality this was Mauritia & the supercontinent Gondwana).

The anomalies of the mammal fauna of Madagascar can best be explained by supposing that... a large continent occupied parts of the Atlantic and Indian Oceans... that this continent was broken up into islands, of which some have become amalgamated with... Africa, some... with what is now Asia; and that in Madagascar and the Mascarene Islands we have existing relics of this great continent, for which... I should propose the name Lemuria!

Parallels
Sclater's theory was hardly unusual for his time; "land bridges", real and imagined, fascinated several of Sclater's contemporaries. Étienne Geoffroy Saint-Hilaire, also looking at the relationship between animals in India and Madagascar, had suggested a southern continent about two decades before Sclater, but did not give it a name. The acceptance of Darwinism led scientists to seek to trace the diffusion of species from their points of evolutionary origin. Before the acceptance of continental drift, biologists frequently postulated the existence of submerged land masses to account for populations of land-based species now separated by barriers of water. Similarly, geologists tried to account for striking resemblances of rock formations on different continents. The first systematic attempt was made by Melchior Neumayr in his book Erdgeschichte in 1887. Many hypothetical submerged land bridges and continents were proposed during the 19th century to account for the present distribution of species.

Promulgation

After gaining some acceptance within the scientific community, the concept of Lemuria began to appear in the works of other scholars. Ernst Haeckel, a Darwinian taxonomist, proposed Lemuria as an explanation for the absence of proto-human "missing links" in the fossil record. According to another source, Haeckel put forward this thesis before Sclater, without using the name "Lemuria".

Supersession
The Lemuria theory disappeared completely from conventional scientific consideration after the theories of plate tectonic and continental drift were accepted by the larger scientific community. According to the theory of plate tectonics, Madagascar and India were indeed once part of the same landmass (thus accounting for geological resemblances), but plate movement caused India to break away millions of years ago, and move to its present location. The original landmass, Mauritia and the supercontinent Gondwana prior to that, broke apart; it predominantly didn't sink beneath sea level.

Kumari Kandam

Some Tamil writers such as Devaneya Pavanar have associated Lemuria with Kumari Kandam, a legendary sunken landmass mentioned in the Tamil literature, claiming that it was the cradle of civilization. A Tamil commentator, Adiyarkunallar, described the dimensions that extended between the Pahruli River and the Kumari River in the Pandyan country that was taken over by the ocean later on.

In popular culture
Since the 1880s, the concept of Lemuria has had a prominent place in the mythology of Theosophy, Anthroposophy and other occult and New Age beliefs, inspiring many novels, television shows, films, and music. These are not scientific ideas, but fall within the realm of pseudoarchaeology and popular culture. Robert Dixon suggests that the popularity of the idea of "lost races" like Lemurians and Atlanteans reflected the anxieties of colonial Australians, that "when Englishness is lost there is nothing to replace it". A. L. McCann attributes Praed's use of the Lemuria trope to an "attempt to create a lineage for white settlers without having to confront the annihilation of Indigenous people" (which Praed's father was involved in).

Australia 
Blavatsky theorised that Australia was a remnant inland region of Lemuria and that Aboriginal Australians and Aboriginal Tasmanians (which she identified as separate groups) were of Lemurian and Lemuro-Atlantean origin, after cross-breeding with animals. Her idea was subsequently developed in pseudo-histories and fiction of the white Australian popular culture of the 1890s and early 1900s, including the writings of nationalist Australian poet Bernard O'Dowd, author Rosa Campbell Praed in My Australian Girlhood, author John David Hennessey in An Australian Bush Track and George Firth Scott's novel The Last Lemurian: A Westralian Romance.

Robert Dixon suggests that the popularity of the idea of "lost races" like Lemurians and Atlanteans reflected the anxieties of colonial Australians, that "when Englishness is lost there is nothing to replace it". A. L. McCann attributes Praed's use of the Lemuria trope to an "attempt to create a lineage for white settlers without having to confront the annihilation of Indigenous people" (which Praed's father was involved in).

Mount Shasta
In 1894, Frederick Spencer Oliver published A Dweller on Two Planets, which claimed that survivors from a sunken continent called Lemuria were living in or on Mount Shasta in northern California. Oliver claimed the Lemurians lived in a complex of tunnels beneath the mountain and occasionally were seen walking the surface dressed in white robes.

In 1931 Harvey Spencer Lewis using the pseudonym Wishar Spenle Cerve wrote a book published by AMORC about the hidden Lemurians of Mount Shasta that a bibliography on Mount Shasta described as "responsible for the legend's widespread popularity." This belief has since been repeated by Guy Warren Ballard and the followers of the Ascended Masters and the Great White Brotherhood, The Bridge to Freedom, The Summit Lighthouse, Church Universal and Triumphant and Kryon.

Kumari Kandam
Some Tamil writers such as Devaneya Pavanar have associated Lemuria with Kumari Kandam, a legendary sunken landmass mentioned in the Tamil literature, claiming that it was the cradle of civilization.

See also
 Mu (mythical lost continent)
 Lemuria in popular culture
 List of lost lands
 Atlantis
 Thule

References

Further reading
 Lost Continents: The Atlantis Theme in History, Science, and Literature (1954) by L. Sprague de Camp. New York: Gnome Press & Dover Press.
 
 Ramaswamy, Sumathi. (1999). "Catastrophic Cartographies: Mapping the Lost Continent of Lemuria". Representations. 67: 92-129.
 Ramaswamy, Sumathi. (2000). "History at Land's End: Lemuria in Tamil Spatial Fables". Journal of Asian Studies. 59(3): 575-602.
 Frederick Spencer Oliver, A Dweller on Two Planets, 1
Cybernetic Culture Research Unit (Ccru). (2015). "Lemurian Time War". Writings 1997-2003. Time Spiral Press.

External links
 Lemuria at the Encyclopedia of Fantasy

 
1864 introductions
Mythological places
Pseudoarchaeology
Esoteric anthropogenesis
Theoretical continents